The Women's 200 metre backstroke competition of the 2016 European Aquatics Championships was held on 16 and 17 May 2016.

Records
Prior to the competition, the existing world, European and championship records were as follows.

Results
The heats were held on 16 May at 11:28.

Heats

Semifinals
The semifinals were held on 16 May at 18:52.

Semifinal 1

Semifinal 2

Final
The final was held on 17 May at 19:09.

References

Women's 200 metre backstroke
2016 in women's swimming